Altie Taylor (September 29, 1947 – February 10, 2009) was an American football running back. He played eight seasons in the National Football League, including seven with the Detroit Lions. He led the Lions in rushing for three consecutive years from 1972 to 1974, appeared in 91 games, 83 as a starter, and in 1975 broke the Lions' career record with 4,297 rushing yards

Early years
Taylor was born in Berkeley, California, in 1947.  He grew up in Pittsburg, California, and attended Pittsburg High School.  He began his college career at Diablo Valley College before transferring to Utah State University. He played for the Utah State Aggies football team from 1966 to 1968. As a junior in 1967, he led the country with a kickoff return average of 31.9 yards.  In 1968, he rushed for 975 yards. On September 28, 1968, he returned the opening kickoff 98 yards for a touchdown and rushed for 90 yards on 20 carries. In August 1969, he had a 78-yard kickoff return and a 54-yard pass reception in the Chicago College All-Star Game against the Super Bowl champion New York Jets.

Professional football
Selected by the Detroit Lions in the second round of the 1969 NFL Draft, Taylor played eight years in the NFL, seven of those years for the Lions from 1969 to 1975. During his time with the Lions, Taylor led the team in rushing for three consecutive years from 1972 to 1974, appeared in 91 games, 83 as a starter, and in 1975 broke the Lions' career record with 4,297 rushing yards (surpassing Nick Pietrosante's mark). He was named the Lions' offensive MVP in 1973, a year in which he rushed for 719 yards, including a 160-yard game against the Green Bay Packers on October 28, 1973. Taylor was traded to the Houston Oilers in August 1976, and appeared in 11 games as a backup during the 1976 season.  In his eight NFL seasons, Taylor gained 5,846 yards from scrimmage, made up of 4,308 rushing yards and 1,548 receiving yards.

Later years
In March 2010, Taylor died at age 62 at his home in Sacramento, California.

See also
 List of NCAA major college yearly punt and kickoff return leaders

References

1947 births
2010 deaths
Players of American football from Berkeley, California
American football running backs
Utah State Aggies football players
Detroit Lions players
Houston Oilers players
People from Pittsburg, California
People from Sacramento, California